Farhad Humbatov (September 10, 1968, Arjut, Sisian District – March 29, 1992, Khankendi, Azerbaijan) was the National Hero of Azerbaijan, and the warrior of the Karabakh war.

Life 
Farhad Humbatov was born on September 10, 1968, in Arjut village of Karakilisa District. In 1983 he graduated from secondary school in his village and entered the vocational school on the specialty of the driver-mechanic. He served his military service first in Chitta and then in Mongolia and was discharged from the army in Irkutsk in 1988.

At that time, Humbatov's parents were often exposed to Armenian aggression and were living in danger like other Azerbaijanis. Despite all the difficulties, he returned to his native village and they moved to Baku with his family. He started his career as a driver in the Consumer Services Department.

Military activities 
Farhad was survived by coincidence during the tragedy of Black January on the 20th of January, 1990. That same night, the Soviet armies, with heavy military equipment, entered Baku and attacked the protesters, firing into the crowds.

Farhad was voluntarily sent to military service. He participated in battles around Shusha, Kosalar, and Khankendi on March 7, 1992, and deployed five Armenians targets. On March 29, 1992, Farhad fought with the Armenian armed forces in the vicinity of Khankendi.  He saved many wounded soldiers of Azerbaijani Army during this battle. Later in this battle, he was killed in a shootout.

Memorial 
He was posthumously awarded the title of "National Hero of Azerbaijan" by Presidential Decree No. 833 dated 7 June 1992. He was buried in the Martyrs' Lane in Baku.

See also 
 First Nagorno-Karabakh War

References

Sources 
Vugar Asgarov. Azərbaycanın Milli Qəhrəmanları (Yenidən işlənmiş II nəşr). Bakı: "Dərələyəz-M", 2010, səh. 118–119.

1968 births
1992 deaths
Azerbaijani military personnel
Azerbaijani military personnel of the Nagorno-Karabakh War
Azerbaijani military personnel killed in action
National Heroes of Azerbaijan